Moycarky or Moycarkey is a civil parish in County Tipperary, Ireland. It is one of 21 civil parishes in the barony of Eliogarty. Partly bounded by the River Suir, it has an area of 3554 statute acres and contains sixteen townlands:
Ash Hill   
Ballyhudda (sometimes written Ballyhuddy)
Butlersfarm    
Coolkip   
Drumgower   
Forgestown    
Graigue    
Kilmelan    
Kilnoe 
Knocknanuss
Knockroe
Knockstowry 
Moycarky
Pouldine
Shanbally
Smithsfarm

As a parish of the Church of Ireland, it was a rectory and vicarage in the Diocese of Cashel. It formed part of the "Union of Clogher".

There is a relatively modern Catholic church at the hamlet of Moycarkey itself.

References

 Moycarky